Nagi Hanatani (born 7 March 1995) is a Japanese tennis player.

Hanatani has a career high WTA singles ranking of 356 achieved on 10 August 2020. She also has a career high WTA doubles ranking of 369 achieved on 28 January 2019.

Hanatani made her WTA main draw debut at the 2021 Tennis in the Land after entering the singles main draw as a lucky loser. She reached the second round, after Anna Blinkova retired after just one game. She lost her second round match against Kateřina Siniaková without winning a game.

ITF Circuit finals

Singles: 1 (1 runner-up)

Doubles: 2 (2 titles)

References

External links

1995 births
Living people
Japanese female tennis players
21st-century Japanese women